World War Joy is the third studio album by American DJ and production duo The Chainsmokers. It was released on December 6, 2019, under Disruptor and Columbia Records. The album features collaborations with Amy Shark, Kygo, Sabrina Claudio, Blink-182, Illenium, Lennon Stella, Bebe Rexha, Ty Dolla $ign, Bülow and 5 Seconds of Summer. World War Joy, which consists of 6 singles gradually released throughout the year (in a vein similar to their previous album, Sick Boy) and 4 new singles, debuted at No. 1 on the Billboard Top  Dance/Electronic Albums Chart.

Background 
Similarly to how their previous album, Sick Boy, was released, The Chainsmokers gradually released World War Joy with new singles monthly, collecting them together as EPs each time.

On February 7, 2019, The Chainsmokers released the album's lead single "Who Do You Love", featuring Australian band 5 Seconds of Summer. In an interview with Billboard on March 27, 2019, they announced plans to release a new album, World War Joy, in 2019. The second single from the album, titled "Kills You Slowly", was released on March 29, 2019. The third single from the album, "Do You Mean", featuring Ty Dolla $ign and Bülow, was released on April 26, 2019. The fourth single from the album, "Call You Mine", featuring Bebe Rexha, was released on May 31, 2019. On July 17, the Chainsmokers revealed the title "Takeaway", the next single, a collaboration with Illenium featuring Lennon Stella, which was released on July 24, 2019, as the fifth single of both World War Joy and Illenium's third album, Ascend. On September 25, while performing in Cincinnati, the duo premiered a new unreleased song from the album called "Push My Luck", which was released later on November 8, 2019. On December 6, 2019, "Family", "P.S. I Hope You're Happy", "See the Way", and "The Reaper" were released as the seventh, eighth, ninth, and tenth singles from the album.

Commercial performance 
The album debuted and peaked at number 65 on the Billboard 200, however it debuted atop Billboard's Top Dance/Electronic Albums chart with 14,000 equivalent album units, including 2,000 from traditional album sales, according to Nielsen Music.

Track listing 
Adapted from Tidal.

Notes
  signifies a co-producer
  signifies an additional producer
  signifies a vocal producer

Personnel
Adapted from Tidal.
 Adam Alpert – executive production
 Alex Pall – production , songwriting  
 Andrew Jackson – songwriting, background vocals  
 Andrew Taggart – production , songwriting , vocals , backing vocals 
 Talay Riley – songwriting , background vocals 
 Luke Hemmings – vocals ,  songwriting 
 Ashton Irwin –  vocals ,  songwriting 
 Calum Hood –  vocals ,  songwriting 
 Michael Clifford –  vocals ,  songwriting 
 Andrew Watt – production 
 Bebe Rexha — vocals

Charts

Weekly charts

Year-end charts

Certifications

Tour 
In support of the album, the duo embarked on the World War Joy Tour in fall 2019 alongside Australian band, 5 Seconds of Summer and Canadian musician Lennon Stella. This tour was different from their previous shows since they are playing a fully live show, and not a hybrid DJ set/live show like the Memories...Do Not Open Tour and some of their festival performances. Matt McGuire returned as drummer as well as serving as music director.  The tour took place across various arenas in 41 North American cities.

References

2019 albums
The Chainsmokers albums
Columbia Records albums
Albums produced by Oak Felder
Albums produced by Andrew Watt (record producer)
Albums produced by London on da Track
Albums produced by Ian Kirkpatrick (record producer)
Albums produced by Travis Barker
Albums produced by Kygo